Alice Eva Lowe (born 3 April 1977) is an English actress, writer, and comedian. She is best known for her roles as Dr. Haynes in Black Mirror: Bandersnatch and Madeleine Wool/Liz Asher in Garth Marenghi's Darkplace. She wrote, directed, and starred in the 2016 film Prevenge and starred in and co-wrote the 2012 film Sightseers. She also starred in the educational children's television series Horrible Histories.

Early life
Lowe was born in Coventry, West Midlands, England. She attended Kenilworth School and graduated from King's College, Cambridge, where she studied classics. At university she became involved in theatre and comedy.

Career
Lowe began her career in surreal experimental theatre shows including City Haunts, Snowbound and Progress in Flying Machines  co-devising and performed along with colleagues such as Robert Webb and David Mitchell. 

Lowe worked under the directorship of Paul King, who has since directed her in The Mighty Boosh and Garth Marenghi's Darkplace. She was cast in Garth Marenghi's Fright Knight alongside fellow Cambridge graduates Richard Ayoade and Matt Holness and they were nominated for the Perrier Award at the Edinburgh Fringe in 2000. In 2001, she won an award for performing in the sequel to Fright Knight, Garth Marenghi's Netherhead, at the Edinburgh Festival Fringe. 

Her television credits include Channel 4's spoof horror comedy Garth Marenghi's Darkplace, Beth in the BBC comedy series My Life in Film, David Bowie in the BBC series Snuff Box, and a recurring role in Rob Brydon's Annually Retentive. She was part of the all-female comedy show Beehive along with Sarah Kendall, Barunka O'Shaughnessy and Clare Thomson which was aired on E4, and was a regular cast member of the CBBC show Horrible Histories during the second, third and fifth seasons. Her BBC Three pilot "LifeSpam: My Child Is French" was broadcast in 2009, and she co-wrote and starred in Channel 4's Orcadia. In February 2010, she appeared in and script-edited the pilot for a "sort-of-sketch-show" called Missing Scene.

She has also guest starred in a number of television shows including as Monkey in "The Priest and the Beast" episode of The Mighty Boosh, as Patricia in the "Fifty-Fifty" episode of The IT Crowd, a solicitor in the "Travel Writer" episode of Black Books, Madonna in an episode of Channel 4's Star Stories, as well as episodes of Little Britain, Come Fly with Me, Ruddy Hell! It's Harry and Paul, Beautiful People and This is Jinsy. She appeared in the music video for "Bastardo" by Charlotte Hatherley, directed by Edgar Wright.

Lowe co-wrote and starred in the short film Stiffy, directed by Jacqueline Wright, which premiered at Cannes in 2005 as part of the Kodak Straight 8 competition. Her self-penned short film Sticks and Balls was screened at Cannes in 2007. In 2010 together with Wright she founded the production company Jackal Films, making a short film each month of that year.

Lowe appeared in the action comedy film Hot Fuzz, and took a lead role in the 2012 film Sightseers, the third production from director Ben Wheatley. Sightseers was written by Lowe with Steve Oram, with additional material by Amy Jump. Lowe had a role in the Edgar Wright-directed film The World's End.

On BBC Radio 4 she has written three series of Alice's Wunderland a dark, surreal comedy.

In 2016, she made her directorial debut on the critically acclaimed  dark comedy Prevenge, which she directed while pregnant. In 2018, Lowe appeared as Dr Haynes on Netflix's first adult-targeted interactive film, Black Mirror: Bandersnatch.

In February 2021, Lowe's next film, Timestalker, was announced. It will star Lowe alongside Sam Riley, Natasia Demetriou, and Jacob Anderson. The film will "chronicl[e] one woman's unrequited love across several centuries [...] from 1680s Western Scotland to the apocalyptic 22nd Century." Lowe stated that "[t]his film is my homage to the most romantic epics. Lavish, lush and overflowing with emotion." Filming is slated to begin in summer of 2021.

Personal life
Lowe was pregnant while filming Prevenge and later gave birth to her daughter Della with partner Paul Synnott. Della portrayed Ruth's newborn in Prevenge when she was ten days old.

Filmography

Film

Television

References

External links
 Official website
 
 

1977 births
Living people
Actresses from Coventry
Alumni of King's College, Cambridge
British women dramatists and playwrights
British women screenwriters
English comedy writers
English dramatists and playwrights
English film actresses
English screenwriters
English stage actresses
English television actresses
English television writers
English women comedians
British women television writers